The Fort Bend Sun—formerly known as the Fort Bend/Southwest Sun—is a weekly community newspaper published in Sugar Land, Texas. The newspaper has a weekly circulation of over 61,000 and is delivered free of charge to homes throughout the cities of Sugar Land, Missouri City, and much of Fort Bend County. It publishes every Wednesday.

The Fort Bend Sun focuses on news and features of interest to the growing suburbs on the southwest side of Houston.

Sugar Land, Texas
Newspapers published in Greater Houston
Publications established in 1982
1982 establishments in Texas
Weekly newspapers published in Texas